Bloomfield School District may refer to: 
Bloomfield Public Schools – Bloomfield, Connecticut
Bloomfield School District – Bloomfield, Indiana
Bloomfield Public Schools – Bloomfield, New Jersey
Bloomfield Schools – Bloomfield, New Mexico.
Bloomfield School District – Bloomfield, Missouri